Netru Indru Naalai is a 1974 Indian Tamil-language film directed by P. Neelakantan. The film stars M. G. Ramachandran Manjula and Latha. It was released on 12 July 1974, and ran for 150 days in theatres.

Plot 

Two swindlers, Nalasivam and Dayalan kill the wife of a wealthy industrialist Manavalan Thangappapuram. The baby who was with the mother, escapes from their claws by the intervention of a farmer, who raises the child as his own child, naming him Manickam. Meanwhile, both criminals see Thangappapuram, with another baby in his arms, and persuade the widower that they saved him. Wild with joy by thinking that he has found his newborn child, Rathnam, Thangappapuram does not know that a terrible trap has just closed on him. Indeed, this fake Rathnam allows both men, Nalasivam and Dayalan to steal some money from Manavalan Thangappapuram. But Manickam, finds that he is the real son of Thangappapuram and knows that his father is in a terrible trap. Manickam tries to prove that he is real Rathnam, but Thangappapuram does not believe Manickam. How Manickam makes his father believe him and save him from the fake Rathnam, Nalasivam and Dayalan – is the plot of the story.

Cast 

The casting is established according to the original order of the credits of opening of the movie, except those not mentioned.

Production 
This film was produced by the actor S. A. Ashokan under his banner, Amalraj Films.

Release and reception 
Netru Indru Naalai was released on 12 July 1974. Kanthan of Kalki appreciated the film for Shanmugham and Amirtham's cinematography, as well as Ramachandran's flawless youthful looks and stunts despite his age.

Soundtrack 
All song were composed by M. S. Viswanathan, except "Nerungi Nerungi Pazhagum Pothu..." which was composed by K. V. Mahadevan.

References

External links 

1970s Tamil-language films
1974 films
Films directed by P. Neelakantan
Films scored by K. V. Mahadevan
Films scored by M. S. Viswanathan